Marri, Iran or Mari, Iran or Meri, Iran may refer to:
 Mari, Khuzestan (مرعي)
 Meri, Mazandaran (مري)
 Marri, Semnan (مري)
 Mari, Zanjan (ماري)